Amen Dunes is the musical project formed by American singer-songwriter and musician Damon McMahon in 2006. McMahon has described Amen Dunes as both a solo project and a band "when it's in action." Frequent collaborators include guitarist and keyboardist Jordi Wheeler and drummer Parker Kindred.

History 
Damon McMahon founded the band Amen Dunes in 2006 in New York, New York.

Amen Dunes' fifth record, Freedom, has received positive reviews, with Pitchfork calling it McMahon's "euphoric breakthrough". In addition to his regular collaborators Parker Kindred and Jordi Wheeler,  Freedom features Delicate Steve and underground Roman musician Panoram. Chris Coady  (Beach House) produced. The record was recorded at Electric Lady Studios in New York City and Sunset Sound in Los Angeles.

Amen Dunes is made up of McMahon and a rotating cast of musicians. In an interview, McMahon explained: "It's a solo project, but it's a band when it's in action, you know what I mean? I always relate to people like David Bowie, who were very considered with their collaborators, and collaboration is what he did, and it's a big part of what I do, but it's a solo project. I have a band per album, you could say. Even less, I have different band for each stage of album development. Because I had a band that helped me flesh out these songs, and then there's a different group of guys who are coming on the road with me."

Discography

Studio albums 
 2009: D.I.A. (Locust)
 2011: Through Donkey Jaw (Sacred Bones Records)
 2013: Spoiler (Perfect Lives)
 2014: Love (Sacred Bones Records)
 2018: Freedom (Sacred Bones Records)

EPs 
 2010: Murder Dull Mind (Sacred Bones Records) – 12"
 2011: Rat On A Grecian Urn (Fixed Identity) – Cassette
 2012: Ethio Covers (self-released) – 7"
 2015: Cowboy Worship (Sacred Bones Records) – 12"

References

External links
 
 Amen Dunes at Sacred Bones Records

American folk rock groups
Indie rock musical groups from New York (state)
Psychedelic rock music groups from New York (state)
Musical groups established in 2006
Sacred Bones Records artists